Cham Shekar (also Romanized as Cham Sheḵar) is a village in Sepiddasht Rural District, Papi District, Khorramabad County, Lorestan Province, Iran. At the 2006 census, its population was 72, in 12 families.

References 

Towns and villages in Khorramabad County